Leshi Zhixin Electronic Technology (Tianjin) Co., Ltd. (also known as LeTV Zhixin) is a Chinese television manufacturer which was a subsidiary of Le.com (aka LeTV). In 2017 Sunac China bought a part of Leshi Zhixin's stake, as well as subscription of new shares. Other new investors of the company were Huaxia Life Insurance (1.1310%) and a private equity fund LeRan Investment.

The company produced TV that branded "Leshi SuperTV".

History

2016
In late 2015, it was announced that Leshi Zhixin would bought the new shares of TCL Multimedia for HK$2.27 billion (HK$6.5 per share), a subsidiary of TCL Corporation. On 11 May 2016, the deal was completed, which Leshi Zhixin holds the stake via Hong Kong incorporated subsidiary Letv ZhiXin Investment (HK) Limited.

2017
After the transaction, Leshi Zhixin would issue 10% new shares to Tianjin Jiarui for an additional  (share capital and share premium combined). After the deals, Le.com would still be the largest shareholder but for 40.3118% only, it was followed by Tianjin Jiarui for 33.4959% and Leshi Holding Beijing for 18.3805%; Xinle would owned just 1.9777% as the fifth largest shareholder, as well as 5.86% would be owned by the others, including two new investors: private equity fund Ningbo Hangzhou Bay New District LeRan Investment Management for 4.0434% stake and Hua Insurance for 1.1310% stake. As part of the deal, Tianjin Jiarui has rights to nominate one out of three directors of Leshi Zhixin.

In February 2017 Le.com formed an agreement with a supplier Truly International Holdings for capital increase. However after a legal mediation the new agreement was for Truly to own 2.6667% at the initial partial investment amount of RMB240 million.

In December 2017, the company was renamed to Xīn Lèshì Zhìjiā.

According to National Enterprise Credit Information Publicity System, as at 20 December 2016, Leshi Holding Beijing, a private company owned by the chairman of Le.com, had pledged all their Leshi Zhixin stake to China Minsheng Trust.

Equity investments
 TCL Multimedia (20.09%)

Footnotes

References

Electronics companies of China
Civilian-run enterprises of China
Manufacturing companies based in Tianjin
Chinese companies established in 2012
Chinese brands